Sergio Rogelio Castillo Arce (born 26 September 1970 in Ledesma, Jujuy Province) is an Argentine–Bolivian retired football midfielder.

Club career
In his early career Castillo played for Argentine clubs Atlético Ledesma and Talleres de Córdoba. He later transferred to Bolivian club Guabirá, where he spent three periods. He also played two periods for The Strongest, in addition to Oriente Petrolero and Wilstermann.

International career
Castillo was also part of the Bolivia national team between 1996 and 2001, earning a total of 34 caps. He represented his country in 12 FIFA World Cup qualification matches.

References

External links

1970 births
Living people
People from Jujuy Province
Association football midfielders
Bolivian footballers
Bolivia international footballers
1997 Copa América players
Talleres de Córdoba footballers
Bolivian Primera División players
Guabirá players
The Strongest players
Oriente Petrolero players
C.D. Jorge Wilstermann players
Bolivian expatriate footballers
Expatriate footballers in Argentina